Sampford Courtenay is a village and civil parish in West Devon in England, most famous for being the place where the Western Rebellion, otherwise known as the Prayerbook rebellion, first started, and where the rebels made their final stand. It has a population of around 600.

The Church of St Andrew is mainly built of granite and has an elegant tower.

Between 1867 and 1972, the village was served by the nearby Sampford Courtenay railway station at Belstone Corner. The station reopened for the heritage Dartmoor Railway between 2002 and 2021, after which it closed permanently.

Literature
Sampford Courtenay is the area author M.R. James had in mind for his short ghost story Martin's Close published in More Ghost Stories in 1911. The New Inn featured in this story is also a real place and a grade II listed old coaching inn originally built in the 16th century.

References

External links

Villages in Devon